The Bede BD-3 is a prototype six passenger homebuilt aircraft.

Design and development
The BD-3 is a six place, low wing pusher configuration aircraft with tricycle landing gear. The aircraft is powered by two engines driving a single shrouded pusher propeller connected with V belts and overriding clutches. The aircraft uses STOL Boundary layer control devices. The fuselage was built using aluminum honeycomb. Bede intended to scale up a turboprop variant for 15 and 24 passengers. The BD-3 prototype was sold to the EAA AirVenture Museum, although by 2013 it did not appear on the museum's list of aircraft owned.

Variants
Bede XBD-2
Flying prototype - Twin Continental O-300
BD-3
Production model

Specifications (BD-3)

See also

References

BD-003
1960s United States civil utility aircraft
Twin-engined single-prop pusher aircraft
Ducted fan-powered aircraft
Low-wing aircraft
Homebuilt aircraft
Aircraft first flown in 1965